Sukumar (born 1970) is a Telugu-language film director.

Sukumar may also refer to:
 Sukumar (writer), Malayalam-language humourist and cartoonist
 Sukumar (1950 film), a film by P. Pullaiah
 Sukumar (2011 film), a film starring Suhani Kalita

People with the given name
 Sukumar Azhikode (1926–2012), Malayalam-language writer and orator

See also
 Sukumaran (1945–1998), Malayalam-language film actor